Kuancheng District is one of seven districts of the prefecture-level city of Changchun, the capital of Jilin Province, Northeast China. It is part of Changchun's main urban area, located north of downtown. It borders Dehui to the northeast, Jiutai to the east, Erdao District to the southeast, Nanguan and Chaoyang Districts to the south, Luyuan District to the southwest, and Nong'an County to the northwest.

History
In May 1898, as Russians were building a railway from  Harbin to Lüshun (the southern branch of the Chinese Eastern Railway), Kuancheng became the location of Changchun's first railway station.

After Russia's loss of the southernmost section of this branch as a result of the Russo-Japanese War,  the Kuancheng station (Kuanchengtze, in contemporary spelling) became the last Russian station on this branch. The next station to the south - the new "Japanese" Changchun station, just a short distance to the south - became the first station of the South Manchuria Railway, which now owned all the tracks running farther south, to Lüshun. A special Russo-Japanese agreement of 1907 provided that Russian gauge tracks would continue from the "Russian"  Kuancheng Station to the "Japanese" Changchun Station, and vice versa, tracks on the "gauge adapted by the South Manchuria Railway" (which happened to be the standard gauge) would continue from the Changchun Station to the Kuancheng Station.

Administrative divisions
There are 13 subdistricts, two towns, and one township.

Subdistricts:
Xinfa Subdistrict, Shengli Subdistrict, Nanguang Subdistrict, Dongguang Subdistrict, Zhanqian Subdistrict, Xiguang Subdistrict, Liuying Subdistrict, Qunying Subdistrict, Kaixuan Subdistrict, Xingye Subdistrict, Tuanshan Subdistrict, Dong'an Subdistrict, Changtong Subdistrict

Towns:
Xinglongshan, Lanjia

The only township is Fenjin Township

References

External links

County-level divisions of Jilin
Changchun